Kiss My Ass may refer to:
Kiss My Ass: Classic Kiss Regrooved, a tribute album featuring cover versions of Kiss songs
Kiss My Ass: The Video, a video album tour by Kiss
Kiss My Ass Tour, music tour of Kiss
Kiss My Ass, initial working title of Jadakiss's album The Last Kiss (album)
Kiss my ass match, a professional wrestling match where the losing wrestler must kiss the winning wrestler's buttocks

See also
Kiss My B-ass
Kiss My Ass Club, a club created by Vince MacMahon which consisted of WWE employees being ordered to kiss his buttocks in the middle of the ring